The 1989 winners of the Torneo di Viareggio (in English, the Viareggio Tournament, officially the Viareggio Cup World Football Tournament Coppa Carnevale), the annual youth football tournament held in Viareggio, Tuscany, are listed below.

Format
The 16 teams are seeded in 4 groups. Each team from a group meets the others in a single tie. The winner of each group progress to the final knockout stage.

Participating teams

Italian teams

  Fiorentina
  Inter Milan
  Lazio
  Milan
  Napoli
  Parma
  Roma
  Torino

European teams

  Aberdeen
  CSKA Sofia
  Dukla Prague
  Porto
  VfB Stuttgart

Asian teams
  Tokyo

American teams

  Sportivo Italiano
  Pumas UNAM

Group stage

Group A

Group B

Group C

Group D

Knockout stage

Champions

Footnotes

External links
 Official Site (Italian)
 Results on RSSSF.com

1988
1988–89 in Italian football
1988–89 in German football
1988–89 in Bulgarian football
1988–89 in Czechoslovak football
1988–89 in Argentine football
1988–89 in Portuguese football
1988–89 in Scottish football
1988–89 in Mexican football
1989 in Japanese football